The 2021 Hartlepool Borough Council election took place on 6 May 2021 as part of the 2021 local elections in the United Kingdom. A byelection for the Hartlepool constituency, which has identical boundaries to the council, was held on the same day.

Boundary changes

In February 2019 the Local Government Boundary Commission for England confirmed changes to the electoral wards of Hartlepool. All 36 seats were up for election, after which, starting in 2022 elections to the council will be done in thirds.

Result summary 
Changes in seat numbers are compared with the composition of the council immediately prior to the election. Changes in vote share are compared with the previous election in 2021.

Council composition
Prior to the election the composition of the council was:

Conservative Party: 4
Labour Party: 8
Independent Union: 6
Socialist Labour Party: 4
Veterans and People's Party: 1
For Britain Movement: 1
Independent: 4
Vacant: 3

Following the election the composition of the council was:

Conservative Party: 13
Labour Party: 11
Independent: 10
Independent Union: 2

Ward results
The Statement of Persons Nominated was published on the 9 April.

Burn Valley

De Bruce

Fens and Greatham

Foggy Furze

Hart

Headland and Harbour

Manor House

Rossmere

Moss Brody was elected in 3rd Place by drawing straws

= Straws drawn due to tie

Rural West

Seaton

Throston

Victoria

References 

2021
Hartlepool